The Labrador Peninsula, or Quebec-Labrador Peninsula, is a large peninsula in eastern Canada. It is bounded by Hudson Bay to the west, the Hudson Strait to the north, the Labrador Sea to the east, and the Gulf of Saint Lawrence to the southeast. The peninsula includes the region of Labrador, which is part of the province of Newfoundland and Labrador, and the regions of Saguenay–Lac-Saint-Jean, Côte-Nord, and Nord-du-Québec, which are in the province of Quebec.

Location and geography

The peninsula is surrounded by sea on all sides, except for the southwest where it widens into the general continental mainland. The northwestern part of the Labrador Peninsula is shaped as a lesser peninsula, the Ungava Peninsula, surrounded by Hudson Bay, the Hudson Strait, and Ungava Bay. The northernmost point of the Ungava Peninsula, Cape Wolstenholme, also serves as the northernmost point of the Labrador Peninsula and of the province of Quebec. The peninsula is a plateau threaded by river valleys. There are several mountain ranges. The mountains also host Torngat Mountains National Park, the only national park of Canada on the Labrador Peninsula. The park is located in the province of Newfoundland and Labrador, whereas the adjacent Kuururjuaq National Park is located in the province of Quebec.

Hydrology
Due to it being covered almost entirely by the Canadian Shield—a vast, rocky plateau with a history of glaciation—the peninsula has a large number of lakes. The province of Quebec alone has more than half a million lakes of varying size. The largest body of water on the Labrador Peninsula is the Smallwood Reservoir, but the largest natural lake is Lake Mistassini. Other lakes of note include the Manicouagan Reservoir, the Caniapiscau Reservoir, and the La Grande 2 and La Grande 3 reservoirs. Due to a history of hydroelectric development, the majority of the larger freshwater lakes on the peninsula are reservoirs. In addition to an abundance of lakes, the peninsula also has many rivers. Other rivers of note include the Eastmain River, Rupert River, and Churchill River.

History
Prior to European colonization, the peninsula was inhabited chiefly by Cree people, notably the Innu Nation in the Southeast area of the peninsula, who referred to their country as Nitassinan (ᓂᑕᔅᓯᓇᓐ), meaning "our land" in the Innu language. Other peoples on the peninsula include the East Cree of Eeyou Istchee (ᐄᔨᔨᐤ/ᐄᔨᔫ/ᐄᓅ ᐊᔅᒌ), the Naskapi whose territories are called St'aschinuw (ᒋᑦ ᐊᔅᒋᓄᐤ, also meaning "our land") as well as the Inuit of Nunavik, Nunatsiavut and NunatuKavut. The area became known as Markland in Greenlandic Norse and its inhabitants were known as the Skræling.

It is widely accepted that the peninsula is named after Portuguese explorer João Fernandes Lavrador. He was granted a patent by King Manuel I of Portugal in 1499 that gave him the right to explore that part of the Atlantic Ocean as set out in the Treaty of Tordesillas. Together with Pêro de Barcelos, he first sighted Labrador in 1498, and charted the coasts of Southwestern Greenland and of adjacent the Northeastern North America around 1498 and gave notice of them in Portugal and Europe. His landowner status allowed him to use the title lavrador, Portuguese for "farmer" or "landholder", but "labrador" in Spanish and Galician means "agricultural worker". He actually gave the name of Terra do Lavrador to Greenland, which was the first land that he sighted, but eventually, the name was spread to all areas until it was set for Labrador.

References

Peninsulas of Quebec
Peninsulas of Newfoundland and Labrador
Landforms of Nord-du-Québec
Landforms of Côte-Nord
Landforms of Saguenay–Lac-Saint-Jean